, nicknamed "Aja", is a professional Japanese baseball player. He plays infielder for the Chiba Lotte Marines.

References

External links

 NPB.com

1989 births
Living people
Chiba Lotte Marines players
Chuo University alumni
Japanese baseball players
Nippon Professional Baseball first basemen
Baseball people from Hiroshima Prefecture